The Women's 400 metres at the 2000 Summer Olympics as part of the athletics programme was held at Stadium Australia on Friday 22 September, Saturday 23 September, Sunday 24 September, and Monday 25 September 2000.

The top three runners in each of the initial seven heats automatically qualified for the second round. The next eight fastest runners from across the heats also qualified for the second round. The top four runners in each of the four second round heats automatically qualified for the semi-final.

The top four runners in each semi-final automatically qualified for the final.

There were a total number of 59 participating athletes.

Records
These were the standing world and Olympic records (in seconds) prior to the 2000 Summer Olympics.

Medals

Results
All times shown are in seconds.
 Q denotes qualification by place in heat.
 q denotes qualification by overall place.
 DNS denotes did not start.
 DNF denotes did not finish.
 DQ denotes disqualification.
 NR denotes national record.
 OR denotes Olympic record.
 WR denotes world record.
 PB denotes personal best.
 SB denotes season best.

Qualifying heats

Round 1

Overall Results Round 1

Round 2

Overall Results Round 2

Semi-finals

Overall Results Semi-Finals

Final

References

External links
 Official Report of the 2000 Sydney Summer Olympics

 
400 metres at the Olympics
Articles containing video clips
2000 in women's athletics
Women's events at the 2000 Summer Olympics